Achmeatoren (Dutch for Achmea Tower) is a skyscraper in Leeuwarden, Friesland, the Netherlands. The Achmeatoren is 114.6 meters (376 ft) high and has 26 floors, it was opened in 2002. The building was commissioned by Achmea and designed by the architects Abe Bonnema and Jan van der Leij from Bonnema Architects in Hardegarijp. Since its completion the building has lost its granite plates three times but fortunately no one has ever been injured.

Achmeatoren is the tallest building in Leeuwarden and Northern Netherlands, it is visible from a large part of Friesland in clear weather.

A Tourist Information Centre (Dutch: VVV) is located on the ground floor, but it will be closed in March 2021.

Objections 
The construction of the Achmeatoren in 1999 raised objections from the aviation side in connection with the nearby military air base in Leeuwarden. However, construction was allowed because of the social importance. Architectural firm Bonnema reluctantly placed four lights at the corners. Later they were replaced by a double-lined neon contour that runs all the way around the top of the tower. Initially this was green, but it was later replaced by red light.

Gallery

References

External links

  Achmeatoren on Bonnema Architects website

Skyscraper office buildings in the Netherlands
Buildings and structures completed in 2002
Buildings and structures in Leeuwarden
Towers in Friesland